Givat Haim (Ihud) (lit. the hill of life [Khaim's Hill] (Union)) is a kibbutz near Hadera in Israel. It is located within the jurisdiction of the Hefer Valley Regional Council.

History
It was formed in 1952 by an ideological split in kibbutz Givat Haim (founded 1932), with Mapam-supporting members forming Givat Haim (Meuhad) which joined the HaKibbutz HaMeuhad movement, and Mapai-supporting members breaking away to create Givat Haim (Ihud), which joined the Mapai-affiliated Ihud HaKvutzot veHaKibbutzim. Today both kibbutzim belong to the Kibbutz Movement.

Economy
As well as agriculture, the kibbutz is home to Prigat, a major soft drink company in Israel.

References

External links

Kibbutzim
Kibbutz Movement
Hefer Valley Regional Council
Populated places established in 1952
Populated places in Central District (Israel)
1952 establishments in Israel